Bachmann is a surname of Switzerland and Germany. It originates as a description of the bearer as dwelling near a brook (Bach), such as a farm "Hofstatt am Bach" also called "Bachmanns Hofstatt" near Hinwil or Dürnten (recorded 1387), or the "Hof zum Bach" near Richterswil (recorded 1555).

Low German variants of the name include ; .

Switzerland
There are three main lines of Bachmann families in Switzerland,
Canton of Thurgau/Canton of Zürich: Attested from 1361 at Stettfurt and Thundorf. Protestants since the Swiss Reformation, this branch came to riches trading wine and linen during the 18th century. Jakob Huldreich Bachmann was a national councillor and a federal judge. 
Canton of Zug: attested in  Menzingen and Zug from 1359. Several reeves and city councillors in the 15th to 16th century. 
Canton of Glarus: this branch moved into Glarus from the Linth plain in the 17th century, and occupied a number of political and military offices in Glarus in the 18th to 19th centuries.

Germany
A Bachmann family of Bohemia is attested as bearing arms in the 15th century. Their coat of arms displays two linden leaves.

North America
The name is often anglicized to Bachman in North America, and sometimes as Baughman.

People
 August Bachmann, German physician and botanist (1652–1723) also known as Augustus Quirinus Rivinus
Barbara Bachmann (died 1999), American biologist
 Carl G. Bachmann, United States Congress Representative (1890–1980)
 Carolin Bachmann (born 1988), German politician
 Eric Bachmann (born 1970), American musician / producer
 Franz Ewald Theodor Bachmann, German medical and naturalist (1850-1937)
 Heinz Bachmann, mathematician (born 1924)
 Ingeborg Bachmann, Austrian poet and author (1926–73)
 John Bachmann, Swiss lithographer and artist (1814–96)
 Josef Bachmann, German would-be assassin (1945–70)
 Joseph Siegmund Bachmann (1754–1825), German organist and composer
 Karl Josef von Bachmann (1734–1792), Swiss aristocrat and general
 Lutz Bachmann (born 1973), German far-right activist, founder of PEGIDA
 Michele Bachmann (born 1956), member of the U.S. Congress from Minnesota
 Niklaus Franz von Bachmann (1740–1831), Swiss nobleman and general
 Paul Bachmann, German mathematician (1837–1920)
 René Bachmann, (born 1967) also known as Robert Flux, German guitar player and music producer, member of the band OOMPH!
 Ramona Bachmann (born 1990), Swiss football (soccer) player
 Werner Emmanuel Bachmann (1901–1951), U.S. chemist

See also
 Bachman (disambiguation)
 Backman

References
Historisches Lexikon der Schweiz

German-language surnames
Swiss-German surnames

ru:Бахман (фамилия)